The National Council for Combating Discrimination is a federal LGBT council created on December 9, 2010, by the Presidential Decree Nº 7.388 of Luiz Inácio Lula da Silva and Human Rights Secretary Paulo Vannuchi. The Conselho Nacional de Combate à Discriminação LGBT is located in Brasília, in the Federal District, in Brazil.

See also

 International LGBT Association
 LGBT rights organization
 OutRage! (UK)
 Stonewall (UK)

References

Government agencies of Brazil
LGBT rights in Brazil